KWWW-FM (96.7 MHz, "KW3") is a radio station broadcasting a Top 40 (CHR) music format. The station went on the air in 1985, built by Jim Corcoran, who owned KWWW-AM in Wenatchee. Licensed to Quincy, Washington, United States, the station is currently owned by Townsquare Media.

References

External links

WWW-FM
Contemporary hit radio stations in the United States
Mass media in Grant County, Washington
Radio stations established in 1985
1985 establishments in Washington (state)
Townsquare Media radio stations